Tham Maya Thapa is a Nepalese politician and  the former Minister of Women, Children and Senior Citizen of Nepal.

References 

Living people
Nepal Communist Party (NCP) politicians
Government ministers of Nepal
Nepal MPs 1991–1994
Nepal MPs 2017–2022
Members of the National Assembly (Nepal)
Members of the 1st Nepalese Constituent Assembly
Communist Party of Nepal (Unified Marxist–Leninist) politicians
1958 births